The Chinese Ambassador to Germany is the official representative of the People's Republic of China to the Federal Republic of Germany.

List of representatives

See also
China–Germany relations

References 

 
Germany
China